It Ain't Over may refer to:

It Ain't Over..., a 2008 album by The Outfield
It Ain't Over (Paul Carrack album), a 2003 album
"It Ain't Over", a song from WOW Gospel 2010
"It Ain't Over", a 2017 song by RuPaul from American